The Duge Bridge, also called the Beipanjiang Bridge, is a 4-lane cable-stayed bridge on the border between the provinces of Guizhou and Yunnan. As of 2021, the bridge is the highest in the world, with the road deck sitting over 565 metres (1,850 feet) above the Beipan River. The bridge is part of the G56 Hangzhou–Ruili Expressway between Qujing and Liupanshui. The eastern tower measures  making it one of the tallest in the world.

The bridge spans  between Xuanwei city, Yunnan and Shuicheng County, Guizhou and shortens the journey between the two places from around five hours' drive to about an hour.

Construction
Construction of the bridge began in 2011. The bridge was completed on 10 September 2016, and was opened to the public on 29 December 2016. The bridge cost a total of ¥1.023 billion and took 3 years to build. It was recognized by the Guinness World Records as the world's highest bridge in 2018.

Gallery

See also

List of highest bridges
List of tallest bridges
List of longest cable-stayed bridge spans
List of largest bridges in China

References

Bridges in Yunnan
Bridges in Guizhou
Suspension bridges in China
Bridges completed in 2016
2016 establishments in China
Transport in Qujing